Vienna Shorts (formerly known as VIS Vienna Independent Shorts) is an international short film festival held annually in May in Vienna. It is the largest short film festival in Austria.

History 

Vienna Independent Shorts was held in 2004 for the first time. Several Viennese institutions active in the promotion of short films arranged one day of the one-week event. The festival program consisted of 125 short films. Among the venues that have been used continuously since the first festival edition are the Top Kino and the Reformed Church.

Since 2005, the festival is hosted the Independent Cinema Association which was founded by the organizers of the first festival edition. For the first time an international competition with 64 films was held. Annually recurring festival events, which were introduced in 2005, are a retrospective of the University of Applied Arts Vienna and a Kino Kabaret.

The festival edition of 2006 included 83 films in international competition. A retrospective was dedicated to Austrian director Mara Mattuschka and short films from Southeast Europe were given a special focus. The film reel of the 26 single films of The Mozart-Minute, which was produced on the occasion of the 250th birthday of Mozart, celebrated its Vienna premiere at the festival. In 2006, venues outside of Vienna – in Dornbirn, Graz and Innsbruck – were also used for festival screenings.

In 2007, a Panorama section with Austrian short films was added to the international competition for the first time. 49 short films were part of the international competition, 23 films were presented in the Panorama section. There were also three retrospectives with short films by Paul Bush, Miranda July and Virgil Widrich. One of several guest programs was curated by the Ars Electronica. In the context of VIS on Tour Vienna Independent Shorts compiled film programs for the Vienna Festival, the Forum Stadtpark, Crossing Europe, the Diagonale, and others. Since 2007, the permanent festival office is located at the quartier21 of the Museumsquartier.

Vienna Independent Shorts 2008 was opened with the world premiere of Eleven Minutes at Vienna's Gartenbaukino with about 1100 guests attending. The Austrian-Swiss anthology film was produced on the occasion of the UEFA Euro 2008 taking place in both countries. Switzerland was given a special focus, including a film program by the Baden Fantoche Animation Film Festival. Forza Bastia, a rarely shown documentary film by Jacques Tati, was screened in the context of an emphasis on films dealing with association football. Retrospectives devoted to Chantal Akerman, Hubert Sielecki and Jerzy Kucia were also presented at the festival. In addition to twenty special and guest programs there were 47 films in international competition and 33 films in the Panorama section.

311 short films were presented during the sixth edition of Vienna Independent Shorts in 2009, including 44 films in international competition. 1129 films from 54 countries were submitted. Major thematic focuses were the memory of the years 1939 (the outbreak of World War II) and 1989 (the fall of the Berlin Wall) as well as the United States and Russia. Retrospectives were devoted to, inter alia, Ben Rivers, Norbert Pfaffenbichler and Lotte Schreiber, and the California Institute of the Arts.

The 2010 VIS Festival was held at seven screening locations in Vienna and two new competitions in the category of international narrative and documentary short film were added: Animation Avantgarde and a national competition that awarded the country's first Austrian Short Film Award. Over 1800 international films were submitted for the festival which had "Dance and Rhythm" as its general thematic focus. The music-based events were presented in cooperation with Radio FM4 and the sixpackfilm distribution firm. Max Hattler and Noriko Okaku premiered their VIS-commissioned audiovisual performance "Resc(O)re 192010". Filmmaker Adnan Popović created the year's popular trailer. Retrospectives on the works Miranda Pennell and Thomas Draschan were presented and the independent Vienna broadcast channel Octo as well as the Austrian national network ORF offered lengthy television coverage on the festival.

Max Hattler created the festival trailer for VIS 2011.

Award winners

See also 

 List of film festivals in Europe

References 

 Ikrath, Philipp (2005), Endabnehmerorientierte Marketingpolitik österreichischer Independent Filmfestivals. Diploma thesis, Vienna

Notes

External links 

 

Film festivals in Austria
Short film festivals
Festivals in Vienna
Spring (season) events in Austria